Waking Life is a 2001 American experimental adult animated film written and directed by Richard Linklater. The film explores a wide range of philosophical issues, including the nature of reality, dreams and lucid dreams, consciousness, the meaning of life, free will, and existentialism. It is centered on a young man who wanders through a succession of dream-like realities wherein he encounters a series of individuals who engage in insightful philosophical discussions.

The entire film was digitally rotoscoped. It contains several parallels to Linklater's 1991 film Slacker. Ethan Hawke and Julie Delpy reprise their characters from the 1995 Before Sunrise in one scene. Waking Life premiered at the 2001 Sundance Film Festival, and was released on October 19, 2001, where it received critical acclaim; however, it underperformed at the box office.

Plot
An unnamed young man lives an ethereal existence that lacks transitions between everyday events and eventually progresses toward an existential crisis. He observes quietly but later participates actively in philosophical discussions involving other characters—ranging from quirky scholars and artists to everyday restaurant-goers and friends—about such issues as metaphysics, free will, social philosophy, and the meaning of life. Other scenes do not even include the protagonist's presence but rather focus on a random isolated person, a group of people, or a couple engaging in such topics from a disembodied perspective. Along the way, the film also touches upon existentialism, situationist politics, posthumanity, the film theory of André Bazin, and lucid dreaming, and makes references to various celebrated intellectual and literary figures by name.

Gradually, the protagonist begins to realize that he is living out a perpetual dream, broken up only by occasional false awakenings. So far, he is mostly a passive onlooker, though this changes during a chat with a passing woman who suddenly approaches him. After she greets him and shares her creative ideas with him, he reminds himself that she is a figment of his own dreaming imagination. Afterward, he starts to converse more openly with other dream characters, but he begins to despair about being trapped in a dream.

The protagonist's final talk is with a character (played by Richard Linklater) whom he briefly encountered previously in the film. This last conversation reveals this other character's view that reality may be only a single instant that the individual interprets falsely as time (and, thus, life); that living is simply the individual's constant negation of God's invitation to become one with the universe; that dreams offer a glimpse into the infinite nature of reality; and that in order to be free from the illusion called life, the individual need only accept God's invitation.

The protagonist is last seen walking into a driveway when he suddenly begins to levitate, paralleling a scene at the start of the film of a floating child in the same driveway. The protagonist uncertainly reaches toward a car's handle but is too swiftly lifted above the vehicle and over the trees. He rises into the endless blue expanse of the sky until he disappears from view.

Cast
Wiley Wiggins plays the protagonist.

The film features appearances from a wide range of actors and non-actors, including:

 Eamonn Healy
 Timothy "Speed" Levitch
 Adam Goldberg
 Nicky Katt
 Ethan Hawke as Jesse
 Julie Delpy as Céline
 Steven Prince
 Caveh Zahedi
 Otto Hofmann
 Richard Linklater
 Alex Jones
 Kim Krizan
 Louis H. Mackey
 Steven Soderbergh
 David Sosa
 Robert C. Solomon
 Steve Brudniak

Production
In a 2001 interview, Linklater estimated that the idea for the film came "before I was even interested in film, probably 20 years ago." For a while he felt the idea for the film "didn't quite work" calling it "too blunt, too realistic" stating that "I think to make a realistic film about an unreality the film had to be a realistic unreality". To create that visual effect, Linklater used an animation technique based on rotoscoping, in which animators overlaid the live-action footage shot by Linklater with animation that roughly approximates the images actually filmed. Linklater employed a variety of artists, so the movie's feel continually changes, producing a surreal, shifting dreamscape.

The animators used standard Apple Macintosh computers. The film was mostly produced using Rotoshop, a rotoscoping program that creates blends between key frame vector shapes, which also uses virtual "layers", designed specifically for the production by Bob Sabiston. Linklater used this animation method again for his 2006 film A Scanner Darkly.

Release
Waking Life premiered at the Sundance Film Festival in January 2001 and was given a limited release in the United States on October 19, 2001.

Reception
On Rotten Tomatoes, the film has an approval rating of 81% based on 145 reviews, with an average rating of 7.40/10. The website's critical consensus reads: "Waking Lifes inventive animated aesthetic adds a distinctive visual component to a film that could easily have rested on its smart screenplay and talented ensemble cast." On Metacritic, which uses a weighted average, the film has a score of 82 out of 100 based on 31 reviews, indicating "universal acclaim". Roger Ebert of the Chicago Sun-Times gave the film four stars out of four, describing it as "a cold shower of bracing, clarifying ideas". Ebert later included the film on his list of "Great Movies". Lisa Schwarzbaum of Entertainment Weekly awarded the film an "A" rating, calling it "a work of cinematic art in which form and structure pursue the logic-defying (parallel) subjects of dreaming and moviegoing," while Stephen Holden of The New York Times wrote it was "so verbally dexterous and visually innovative that you can't absorb it unless you have all your wits about you". Dave Kehr of The New York Times found the film to be "lovely, fluid, funny" and stated that it "never feels heavy or over-ambitious".

Conversely, J. Hoberman of The Village Voice felt that Waking Life "doesn't leave you in a dream... so much as it traps you in an endless bull session". Frank Lovece felt the film was "beautifully drawn" but called its content "pedantic navel-gazing".

In 2018, Richard Linklater addressed the potentially controversial inclusion of Alex Jones in the film. In an interview with IndieWire, Linklater states, "I just thought he was kind of funny." He notes that he never imagined Jones would one day be taken seriously and that at the time, he didn't think much of including him.

Nominated for numerous awards, mainly for its technical achievements, Waking Life won the National Society of Film Critics award for "Best Experimental Film", the New York Film Critics Circle award for "Best Animated Film", and the "CinemAvvenire" award at the Venice Film Festival for "Best Film". It was also nominated for the Golden Lion, the festival's main award.

The film is recognized by American Film Institute in these lists:
 2008 – AFI's 10 Top 10: Nominated Animation Film

Home media
The film was released on DVD in North America in May 2002. Special features included several commentaries, documentaries, interviews, trailers, and deleted scenes, as well as the short film Snack and Drink. A bare-bones DVD with no special features was released in Region 2 in February 2003. A Blu-Ray was released in Germany and the UK.

Soundtrack

The Waking Life OST was performed and written by Glover Gill and the Tosca Tango Orchestra, except for Frédéric Chopin's Nocturne in E-flat major, Op. 9, No. 2. The soundtrack was relatively successful. Featuring the nuevo tango style, it bills itself "the 21st Century Tango". The tango contributions were influenced by the music of the Argentine "father of new tango" Astor Piazzolla.

See also
 Dream argument
 Dream art
Oneironautics
 Simulated reality

References

Bibliography

External links

 
 
 
 
 

2001 films
2001 animated films
2000s American animated films
2001 drama films
American avant-garde and experimental films
Animated drama films
Films about dreams
Magic realism films
2000s English-language films
Fox Searchlight Pictures films
Animated films directed by Richard Linklater
Rotoscoped films
Films shot in Texas
Films shot in Austin, Texas
Films shot in San Antonio
Films about philosophy
Metaphysical fiction films
Existentialist films
2000s avant-garde and experimental films
American adult animated films
Before trilogy
American independent films
2001 independent films